João Carlos Heidemann (born 6 April 1988), known as João Carlos, is a Brazilian footballer who plays as a goalkeeper for Cuiabá.

Career statistics

Honours
Atlético Goianiense
Campeonato Goiano: 2011

CSA
Campeonato Alagoano: 2019

Cuiabá
Campeonato Mato-Grossense: 2021, 2022

References

External links

1988 births
Living people
People from Paranavaí
Brazilian people of German descent
Brazilian footballers
Association football goalkeepers
Campeonato Brasileiro Série A players
Campeonato Brasileiro Série B players
Campeonato Brasileiro Série C players
Club Athletico Paranaense players
Atlético Clube Goianiense players
Ipatinga Futebol Clube players
Fortaleza Esporte Clube players
Nacional Esporte Clube (MG) players
Boa Esporte Clube players
Associação Atlética Ponte Preta players
Centro Sportivo Alagoano players
Cuiabá Esporte Clube players
Sportspeople from Paraná (state)